Give The People What We Want: Songs of The Kinks is a 2001 tribute album to music of The Kinks by various garage, punk and indie artists from the Northwestern United States.

As described by one reviewer, the compilation is a "truly weird amalgamation that eviscerates the competition by providing you with what you never even thought about wanting. For instance: a quiet, heartfelt rendition of 'Waterloo Sunset', as performed by the Fastbacks. It's the most charmlessly charming, utterly superfluous album I've heard in a while; where most tribute albums suffer from a hyper-obsession while remaining true to the original artist, this compilation makes a strong case for the offbeat."

Track listing

"Revenge" - C Average 2:55
"Gotta Get the First Plane Home" - Young Fresh Fellows 2:03
"Nothin' in the World Can Stop Me from Worryin' About That Girl" - Mark Lanegan 4:12
"Who Will Be the Next in Line" - Mudhoney 2:10
"Ring the Bells" - Model Rockets 2:25
"This Man He Weeps Tonight" - Fall Outs 2:20
"The Way Love Used to Be" - Heather Duby 2:40
"Sunny Afternoon" - Baby Gramps 5:00
"Alcohol" - Murder City Devils 3:25
"Session Man" - Congratulators 3:06
"Tin Soldier Man" - Love As Laughter 3:46
"Waterloo Sunset" - Fastbacks 3:23
"Fancy" - Jon Auer 3:04
"Brainwashed" - Pinkos 2:18
"Act Nice and Gentle" - Larry Barrett 2:55
"Wicked Annabella" - The Minus 5 2:25
"Strangers" - Makers 3:49
"Come Dancing" - Briefs 2:25
"I Go to Sleep" - Nikol Kollars 3:53

References

2001 compilation albums
The Kinks tribute albums
Sub Pop compilation albums